Paul Richard Anderson OBE (26 February 1935 – 7 March 2022) was a British sailor and bronze medallist. He won a bronze medal in the 5.5 Metre class at the 1968 Summer Olympics together with Robin Aisher and Adrian Jardine.

Anderson was appointed Officer of the Order of the British Empire (OBE) in the 2011 Birthday Honours for services to Special Olympics Great Britain. He died on 7 March 2022, at the age of 87.

References

External links
 
 
 

1935 births
2022 deaths
British male sailors (sport)
Olympic sailors of Great Britain
Sailors at the 1968 Summer Olympics – 5.5 Metre
Olympic bronze medallists for Great Britain
Officers of the Order of the British Empire
Olympic medalists in sailing
Medalists at the 1968 Summer Olympics
1964 America's Cup sailors
20th-century British people